The American College Health Association (ACHA) is a Silver Spring, Maryland-based organization of college health professionals throughout the United States. It was founded in 1920 as the American Student Health Association (ASHA), obtaining its current name in 1948. Over 800 higher education institutions are members of the ACHA, as of 2019. The association also has over 2,800 individual health care professionals as members. Since 1958, the association's official journal has been the Journal of American College Health, which was founded in 1958 as Student Medicine.

References

External links

Health care-related professional associations based in the United States
Organizations established in 1920
Medical and health organizations based in Maryland
1920 establishments in the United States